Soraisham Dinesh Singh (born 5 December 1997) is an Indian professional footballer who plays as a centre-back for I-League club Sreenidi Deccan.

Career

Sreenidi Deccan
Singh made his debut for Sreenidi Deccan on 27 December 2021, against NEROCA in a 3–2 loss.

Career statistics

Club

References

1989 births
Living people
Indian footballers
I-League players
Salgaocar FC players
Association football defenders
Sreenidi Deccan FC players
Footballers from Manipur